Boechout is a railway station in Boechout, Antwerp, Belgium. The station opened in 1864 on the Line 15.

Train services
The following services currently the serve the station:

Local services (L-23) Antwerp - Aarschot - Leuven
Local services (L-24) Antwerp - Herentals - Mol (weekdays)

Bus services
These bus services depart from the Gemeentehuis, 100m east of the station. They are operated by De Lijn.

51 (Vremde - Boechout - Hove - Mortsel - Mortsel Station - Antwerp Airport - Berchem)
90 (Berchem - Mortsel - Boechout - Lier Veemarkt)

References

Railway stations opened in 1864
Railway stations in Belgium
Railway stations in Antwerp Province
Boechout